Missouri Employers Mutual Insurance is a workers' compensation provider in Missouri. MEM provides coverage in nearly all 600 National Council on Compensation Insurance (NCCI) classes. Headquartered in Columbia, Missouri, MEM has offices in Kansas City, Missouri, Springfield, Missouri, and St. Louis, Missouri. MEM has more than 17,000 insureds, and holds an A. M. Best rating of A− (excellent).

References

External links
Missouri Employers Mutual

Insurance companies of the United States
Companies based in Columbia, Missouri
Mutual insurance companies
Mutual insurance companies of the United States
1995 establishments in Missouri
American companies established in 1995
Financial services companies established in 1995